The men's discus throw event at the 2008 Summer Olympics took place on 16–19 August at the Beijing National Stadium. Thirty-seven athletes from 29 nations competed. The event was won by Gerd Kanter of Estonia, the nation's first victory in the men's discus throw. Piotr Małachowski took silver to give Poland its first medal in the event. Lithuanian thrower Virgilijus Alekna's bronze made him the third man to win three medals in the sport, adding to his gold medals from 2000 and 2004.

Background

This was the 26th appearance of the event, which is one of 12 athletics events to have been held at every Summer Olympics. The returning finalists from the 2004 Games were two-time gold medalist (and 1996 finalist) Virgilijus Alekna of Lithuania, silver medalist Zoltán Kővágó of Hungary, bronze medalist (and 2000 finalist) Aleksander Tammert of Estonia, fifth-place finisher Frantz Kruger of South Africa, sixth-place finisher Casey Malone of the United States, eleventh-place finisher Gabor Mate of Hungary, and Róbert Fazekas (also of Hungary), who had initially won in 2004 but had been disqualified for doping. Alekna had won the 2003 and 2005 world championships as well as the 2000 and 2004 Olympics. The 2007 world champion was Gerd Kanter of Estonia. Alekna and Kanter were favored in Beijing.

The British Virgin Islands made its debut in the men's discus throw. The United States made its 25th appearance, most of any nation, having missed only the boycotted 1980 Games.

Qualification

The qualifying standards were 64.50 m (211.61 ft) (A standard) and 62.50 m (205.05 ft) (B standard). Each National Olympic Committee (NOC) was able to enter up to three entrants providing they had met the A qualifying standard in the qualifying period (1 January 2007 to 23 July 2008). NOCs were also permitted to enter one athlete providing he had met the B standard in the same qualifying period. The maximum number of athletes per nation had been set at 3 since the 1930 Olympic Congress.

Competition format

The competition used the two-round format introduced in 1936, with the qualifying round completely separate from the divided final. In qualifying, each athlete received three attempts; those recording a mark of at least 64.50 metres advanced to the final. If fewer than 12 athletes achieved that distance, the top 12 would advance. The results of the qualifying round were then ignored. Finalists received three throws each, with the top eight competitors receiving an additional three attempts. The best distance among those six throws counted.

Records

Prior to the competition, the existing world and Olympic records were as follows.

No new world or Olympic records were set during the competition.

Schedule

All times are China standard time (UTC+8)

Results

Qualifying round

Qualification: 64.50 (Q) or at least 12 best performers (q) advance to the final.

Final

References

Athletics at the 2008 Summer Olympics
Discus throw at the Olympics
Men's events at the 2008 Summer Olympics